Ronald Cassidy (3 February 1939 – 5 December 2020) was a Trinidad cyclist. He competed in the individual pursuit at the 1964 Summer Olympics.

References

1939 births
2020 deaths
Trinidad and Tobago male cyclists
Olympic cyclists of Trinidad and Tobago
Cyclists at the 1964 Summer Olympics
Place of birth missing (living people)
20th-century Trinidad and Tobago people